Ingo Peyker (born 8 September 1941) is an Austrian athlete. He competed in the men's pole vault at the 1968 Summer Olympics.

References

1941 births
Living people
Athletes (track and field) at the 1968 Summer Olympics
Austrian male pole vaulters
Olympic athletes of Austria
Place of birth missing (living people)